Iron Galaxy Studios, LLC is an American video game developer studio founded on August 14, 2008, and based in Chicago, Illinois, with a second studio in Orlando, Florida that was opened in 2012 and a third studio in Austin, Texas. Iron Galaxy does contract work for larger developers to perform "technical consulting", and to port games to different platforms. Iron Galaxy debuted with their first original property with Wreckateer in 2012, their second with Divekick in 2013 and their third with Videoball in 2016.

In July 2016, Adam Boyes became CEO of Iron Galaxy, with Dave Lang staying around to manage prototypes and business development.

Games

Original works

Published games

Ports

References

External links 
 

 
Companies based in Chicago
Video game companies established in 2008
Video game companies of the United States
Video game development companies
American companies established in 2008
2008 establishments in Illinois